
Gmina Tarnowo Podgórne is a rural gmina (administrative district) in Poznań County, Greater Poland Voivodeship, in west-central Poland.

Villages
Gmina Tarnowo Podgórne contains the villages and settlements of Baranowo, Batorowo, Ceradz Kościelny, Chyby, Góra, Jankowice, Kokoszczyn, Lusówko, Lusowo, Przeźmierowo, Rumianek, Sady, Sierosław, Swadzim, Tarnowo Podgórne and Wysogotowo.

Neighbouring gminas
Gmina Tarnowo Podgórne is bordered by the city of Poznań and by the gminas of Buk, Dopiewo, Duszniki, Kaźmierz and Rokietnica.

References
 Polish official population figures 2006

Tarnowo Podgorne
Poznań County